The 2005–06 New York Rangers season was the franchise's 79th season of play and their 80th season overall. It marked a resurgence for the Rangers, with the team finishing the season having recorded 100 points, the sixth time in franchise history that the team had reached the 100-point plateau and their highest point total since their 1993–94 championship season, and a return to the playoffs for the first time since 1996–97. Jaromir Jagr also broke several Rangers single-season records including goals (54), points (123), power-play goals (24) and shots on goal (368).  The Rangers missed out on winning the Atlantic Division on the last day of the regular season when the Devils defeated the Montreal Canadiens and the Rangers lost to the Ottawa Senators. The Rangers qualified for the playoffs as the sixth seed but were swept by their rivals the New Jersey Devils in the first round.

Regular season
 October 17, 2005 – Henrik Lundqvist becomes the first Rangers rookie goaltender to record a shutout since John Vanbiesbrouck in the 1984–85 season, in a 4-0 Rangers win at home over the Florida Panthers.
 March 11, 2006 – The New York Rangers played the Montreal Canadiens at the Bell Centre in Montreal. The pre-game festivities involved the jersey retirement for former Canadien and Ranger player Bernie Geoffrion.
 March 29, 2006 - Jaromir Jagr records 4 assists, accumulating 113 points for the season and breaking the club single season points record of 109, previously held by Jean Ratelle, (1972–73). Jagr would finish the season with 123 points, the 3rd best total of his illustrious career.
 March 29, 2006 - Henrik Lundqvist sets a franchise record for rookie goaltenders with his 30th win of the season, in a 5–1 win over the Islanders.
 April 8, 2006 – Jaromir Jagr records a goal and three assists, accumulating 53 goals for the season and breaking the club single season goal scoring record of 52, previously held by Adam Graves, (1993–94). Jagr would finish the season with 54 goals, the second best total of his career.
 April 8, 2006 – The Rangers beat the Boston Bruins 4–3 in overtime, capturing their 100th point in their final victory of the season.

Season standings

Playoffs

The Rangers qualified for the playoffs for the first time since the 1997 Stanley Cup playoffs.

Schedule and results

Regular season

|- align="center" bgcolor="#CCFFCC"
| 1 || October 5 || @ Philadelphia Flyers || 5–3 || 1–0–0 || 
|- align="center" bgcolor="white"
| 2 || October 6 || Montreal Canadiens || 4–3 OT || 1–0–1 || 
|- align="center" bgcolor="white"
| 3 || October 8 || @ New Jersey Devils || 3–2 OT || 1–0–2 || 
|- align="center" bgcolor="#FFBBBB"
| 4 || October 10 || @ Washington Capitals || 3–2 || 1–1–2 || 
|- align="center" bgcolor="#CCFFCC"
| 5 || October 13 || New Jersey Devils || 4–1 || 2–1–2 || 
|- align="center" bgcolor="#CCFFCC"
| 6 || October 15 || Atlanta Thrashers || 5–1 || 3–1–2 || 
|- align="center" bgcolor="#CCFFCC"
| 7 || October 17 || Florida Panthers || 4–0 || 4–1–2 || 
|- align="center" bgcolor="white"
| 8 || October 19 || New York Islanders || 3–2 SO || 4–1–3 || 
|- align="center" bgcolor="#FFBBBB"
| 9 || October 20 || @ New York Islanders || 5–4 || 4–2–3 || 
|- align="center" bgcolor="#FFBBBB"
| 10 || October 22 || @ Buffalo Sabres || 3–1 || 4–3–3 || 
|- align="center" bgcolor="#CCFFCC"
| 11 || October 27 || New York Islanders || 3–1 || 5–3–3 || 
|- align="center" bgcolor="#CCFFCC"
| 12 || October 29 || @ Montreal Canadiens || 5–2 || 6–3–3 || 
|- align="center" bgcolor="#FFBBBB"
| 13 || October 31 || Montreal Canadiens || 4–1 || 6–4–3 || 
|-

|- align="center" bgcolor="#CCFFCC"
| 14 || November 3 || @ New Jersey Devils || 4–2 || 7–4–3 || 
|- align="center" bgcolor="#CCFFCC"
| 15 || November 5 || New Jersey Devils || 3–2 SO || 8–4–3 || 
|- align="center" bgcolor="#FFBBBB"
| 16 || November 7 || Pittsburgh Penguins || 3–2 || 8–5–3 || 
|- align="center" bgcolor="#CCFFCC"
| 17 || November 9 || @ Florida Panthers || 4–3 SO || 9–5–3 || 
|- align="center" bgcolor="#CCFFCC"
| 18 || November 10 || @ Tampa Bay Lightning || 5–2 || 10–5–3 || 
|- align="center" bgcolor="#CCFFCC"
| 19 || November 12 || @ Pittsburgh Penguins || 6–1 || 11–5–3 || 
|- align="center" bgcolor="#FFBBBB"
| 20 || November 15 || @ Toronto Maple Leafs || 2–1 || 11–6–3 || 
|- align="center" bgcolor="#FFBBBB"
| 21 || November 17 || @ Carolina Hurricanes || 5–1 || 11–7–3 || 
|- align="center" bgcolor="#CCFFCC"
| 22 || November 19 || Carolina Hurricanes || 4–3 || 12–7–3 || 
|- align="center" bgcolor="#CCFFCC"
| 23 || November 20 || Boston Bruins || 3–2 || 13–7–3 || 
|- align="center" bgcolor="#CCFFCC"
| 24 || November 22 || @ Buffalo Sabres || 3–2 SO || 14–7–3 || 
|- align="center" bgcolor="#CCFFCC"
| 25 || November 24 || @ Atlanta Thrashers || 6–3 || 15–7–3 || 
|- align="center" bgcolor="#CCFFCC"
| 26 || November 26 || Washington Capitals || 3–2 SO || 16–7–3 || 
|-

|- align="center" bgcolor="#CCFFCC"
| 27 || December 1 || Pittsburgh Penguins || 2–1 || 17–7–3 || 
|- align="center" bgcolor="#FFBBBB"
| 28 || December 3 || @ Washington Capitals || 5–1 || 17–8–3 || 
|- align="center" bgcolor="#CCFFCC"
| 29 || December 5 || Minnesota Wild || 3–1 || 18–8–3 || 
|- align="center" bgcolor="white"
| 30 || December 7 || @ Chicago Blackhawks || 2–1 OT || 18–8–4 || 
|- align="center" bgcolor="#CCFFCC"
| 31 || December 8 || @ Nashville Predators || 5–1 || 19–8–4 || 
|- align="center" bgcolor="#CCFFCC"
| 32 || December 10 || @ St. Louis Blues || 5–4 OT || 20–8–4 || 
|- align="center" bgcolor="#FFBBBB"
| 33 || December 13 || Vancouver Canucks || 3–2 || 20–9–4 || 
|- align="center" bgcolor="#FFBBBB"
| 34 || December 18 || Colorado Avalanche || 2–1 || 20–10–4 || 
|- align="center" bgcolor="#FFBBBB"
| 35 || December 20 || New Jersey Devils || 3–1 || 20–11–4 || 
|- align="center" bgcolor="#CCFFCC"
| 36 || December 22 || Tampa Bay Lightning || 4–2 || 21–11–4 || 
|- align="center" bgcolor="#FFBBBB"
| 37 || December 26 || @ Ottawa Senators || 6–2 || 21–12–4 || 
|- align="center" bgcolor="#CCFFCC"
| 38 || December 28 || @ New York Islanders || 6–2 || 22–12–4 || 
|- align="center" bgcolor="white"
| 39 || December 31 || @ Pittsburgh Penguins || 4–3 OT || 22–12–5 || 
|-

|- align="center" bgcolor="white"
| 40 || January 3 || Tampa Bay Lightning || 1–0 OT || 22–12–6 || 
|- align="center" bgcolor="white"
| 41 || January 5 || Philadelphia Flyers || 4–3 OT || 22–12–7 || 
|- align="center" bgcolor="#CCFFCC"
| 42 || January 7 || Florida Panthers || 4–0 || 23–12–7 || 
|- align="center" bgcolor="#CCFFCC"
| 43 || January 10 || Calgary Flames || 4–2 || 24–12–7 || 
|- align="center" bgcolor="#CCFFCC"
| 44 || January 12 || Edmonton Oilers || 5–4 OT || 25–12–7 || 
|- align="center" bgcolor="#FFBBBB"
| 45 || January 14 || @ Detroit Red Wings || 4–3 || 25–13–7 || 
|- align="center" bgcolor="#FFBBBB"
| 46 || January 16 || @ Columbus Blue Jackets || 4–3 || 25–14–7 || 
|- align="center" bgcolor="#CCFFCC"
| 47 || January 19 || @ Pittsburgh Penguins || 4–2 || 26–14–7 || 
|- align="center" bgcolor="#CCFFCC"
| 48 || January 21 || @ Boston Bruins || 3–2 SO || 27–14–7 || 
|- align="center" bgcolor="#CCFFCC"
| 49 || January 22 || New Jersey Devils || 3–1 || 28–14–7 || 
|- align="center" bgcolor="#FFBBBB"
| 50 || January 24 || Buffalo Sabres || 2–1 || 28–15–7 || 
|- align="center" bgcolor="#CCFFCC"
| 51 || January 28 || Pittsburgh Penguins || 7–1 || 29–15–7 || 
|- align="center" bgcolor="white"
| 52 || January 30 || Philadelphia Flyers || 3–2 OT || 29–15–8 || 
|-

|- align="center" bgcolor="#CCFFCC"
| 53 || February 1 || Pittsburgh Penguins || 3–1 || 30–15–8 || 
|- align="center" bgcolor="#CCFFCC"
| 54 || February 2 || @ New York Islanders || 5–2 || 31–15–8 || 
|- align="center" bgcolor="#CCFFCC"
| 55 || February 4 || @ Philadelphia Flyers || 4–3 OT || 32–15–8 || 
|- align="center" bgcolor="#CCFFCC"
| 56 || February 8 || Ottawa Senators || 5–1 || 33–15–8 || 
|- align="center" bgcolor="#CCFFCC"
| 57 || February 10 || Toronto Maple Leafs || 4–2 || 34–15–8 || 
|- align="center" bgcolor="#CCFFCC"
| 58 || February 11 || @ Toronto Maple Leafs || 4–2 || 35–15–8 || 
|-

|- align="center" bgcolor="#CCFFCC"
| 59 || March 2 || @ Philadelphia Flyers || 6–1 || 36–15–8 || 
|- align="center" bgcolor="#FFBBBB"
| 60 || March 4 || @ New Jersey Devils || 2–1 || 36–16–8 || 
|- align="center" bgcolor="#FFBBBB"
| 61 || March 6 || Carolina Hurricanes || 2–1 || 36–17–8 || 
|- align="center" bgcolor="white"
| 62 || March 8 || @ Atlanta Thrashers || 3–2 SO || 36–17–9 || 
|- align="center" bgcolor="#FFBBBB"
| 63 || March 11 || @ Montreal Canadiens || 1–0 || 36–18–9 || 
|- align="center" bgcolor="white"
| 64 || March 12 || Atlanta Thrashers || 3–2 OT || 36–18–10 || 
|- align="center" bgcolor="#FFBBBB"
| 65 || March 14 || @ Carolina Hurricanes || 5–3 || 36–19–10 || 
|- align="center" bgcolor="#CCFFCC"
| 66 || March 16 || Washington Capitals || 5–4 || 37–19–10 || 
|- align="center" bgcolor="#CCFFCC"
| 67 || March 18 || Toronto Maple Leafs || 5–2 || 38–19–10 || 
|- align="center" bgcolor="#CCFFCC"
| 68 || March 20 || Boston Bruins || 5–2 || 39–19–10 || 
|- align="center" bgcolor="#FFBBBB"
| 69 || March 22 || Philadelphia Flyers || 6–3 || 39–20–10 || 
|- align="center" bgcolor="white"
| 70 || March 24 || @ Florida Panthers || 3–2 SO || 39–20–11 || 
|- align="center" bgcolor="white"
| 71 || March 25 || @ Tampa Bay Lightning || 4–3 SO || 39–20–12 || 
|- align="center" bgcolor="#CCFFCC"
| 72 || March 27 || Buffalo Sabres || 5–4 SO || 40–20–12 || 
|- align="center" bgcolor="#CCFFCC"
| 73 || March 29 || @ New York Islanders || 5–1 || 41–20–12 || 
|- align="center" bgcolor="#FFBBBB"
| 74 || March 30 || @ Ottawa Senators || 4–1 || 41–21–12 || 
|-

|- align="center" bgcolor="#CCFFCC"
| 75 || April 4 || Philadelphia Flyers || 3–2 SO || 42–21–12 || 
|- align="center" bgcolor="#CCFFCC"
| 76 || April 6 || New York Islanders || 3–1 || 43–21–12 || 
|- align="center" bgcolor="#CCFFCC"
| 77 || April 8 || @ Boston Bruins || 4–3 OT || 44–21–12 || 
|- align="center" bgcolor="#FFBBBB"
| 78 || April 9 || @ New Jersey Devils || 3–2 || 44–22–12 || 
|- align="center" bgcolor="#FFBBBB"
| 79 || April 11 || New York Islanders || 3–2 || 44–23–12 || 
|- align="center" bgcolor="#FFBBBB"
| 80 || April 13 || @ Pittsburgh Penguins || 5–3 || 44–24–12 || 
|- align="center" bgcolor="#FFBBBB"
| 81 || April 15 || @ Philadelphia Flyers || 4–1 || 44–25–12 || 
|- align="center" bgcolor="#FFBBBB"
| 82 || April 18 || Ottawa Senators || 5–1 || 44–26–12 || 
|-

|-
| Legend:

Playoffs

|- align="center" bgcolor="#FFBBBB"
| 1 || April 22 || @ New Jersey Devils || 1–6 || 19,040 || Devils lead 1–0 || 
|- align="center" bgcolor="#FFBBBB"
| 2 || April 24 || @ New Jersey Devils || 1–4 || 19,040 || Devils lead 2–0 || 
|- align="center" bgcolor="#FFBBBB"
| 3 || April 26 || New Jersey Devils || 0–3 || 18,200 || Devils lead 3–0 || 
|- align="center" bgcolor="#FFBBBB"
| 4 || April 29 || New Jersey Devils || 2–4 || 18,200 || Devils win 4–0 || 
|-

|-
| Legend:

Player statistics

Scoring
 Position abbreviations: C = Center; D = Defense; G = Goaltender; LW = Left Wing; RW = Right Wing
  = Joined team via a transaction (e.g., trade, waivers, signing) during the season. Stats reflect time with the Rangers only.
  = Left team via a transaction (e.g., trade, waivers, release) during the season. Stats reflect time with the Rangers only.

Goaltending

Awards and records

Awards

Transactions
The Rangers were involved in the following transactions from February 17, 2005, the day after the 2004–05 NHL season was officially cancelled, through June 19, 2006, the day of the deciding game of the 2006 Stanley Cup Finals.

Trades

Players acquired

Players lost

Signings

Draft picks
New York's picks at the 2005 NHL Entry Draft in Ottawa, Ontario, Canada at the Westin Hotel.

Notes

References

New York Rangers seasons
New York Rangers
New York Rangers
New York Rangers
New York Rangers
 in Manhattan
Madison Square Garden